Marcelo Vega may refer to:

 Marcelo Vega (footballer, born 1971), Chilean footballer
 Marcelo Vega (footballer, born 1986), Argentine footballer

See also 
 Marcelo Veiga, Brazilian football manager and player